National Competition Policy may refer to:

National Competition Policy (India)
National Competition Policy (Australia)